Count Charles-Daniel de Meuron (6 May 1738 - 4 April 1806) was the founder of a Swiss mercenary regiment, Regiment de Meuron, which was employed in the service of the Dutch East India Company in Cape Town and Ceylon.

History 
Charles-Daniel was born in Neuchâtel and enlisted as an ensign in the Swiss Marine Regiment de Hallwyl in 1756. After service in the Seven Years' War against the British, de Meuron transferred to the Swiss Guard. He rose to become a colonel and was made a count in 1763.

In 1768, de Meuron was awarded the Croix du mérite militaire. A contract with the Dutch East India Company allowed him to create his own regiment. This regiment was dispatched from France to Cape Town, before moving to Ceylon. The Regiment shifted alliance to the English in 1796 transferring Ceylon into the British Empire and then serving the British East India Company. In 1799, the Regiment de Meuron fought against Tipu Sultan in the Battle of Seringapatam. The regimental flag had the symbols of a sword and a mulberry tree. The sword represented military power while the mulberry tree, from which tapa cloth was made, is thought to have indicated his interest in objects of natural history. His collections of curiosities are now housed at the museum in Neuchatel.

The regiment was plagued with problems, partly from the prickly personality of the founder. Although hired by the Dutch, the Dutch saw the regiment as being favourable to the French. Charles-Daniel tried to impress upon the Dutch that he was against the French. He became very unpopular among his officers, many of whom mutinied, as well as the Governor of the Cape, Van Plettenberg. Even before the Regiment left for the Cape, they had an outbreak of smallpox at the Ile d'Oleron in the west of France. The subsequent shortfall of 380 men was made up by an intake of prisoners from jails in Paris. The original composition was made up of two-thirds Swiss and the remainder of Germans and others. The 800 strong regiment finally left France and a hurricane caused further delay during their journey to the Cape. They were reduced to half rations for eighty days and 300 men got scurvy and 103 died in en route. Twenty more died shortly after reaching cape Town. Some of the troops defected to join Boer farmers. De Meuron held the captain of the Fier, d'Albarade, responsible and claimed that he had stocked the ship with illicit cargo and trading merchandise instead of sufficient provisions for the troops. This claim required the Dutch to hold the ship at the port for investigation. There were altercations between the French sailors and the remaining members of the Meuron Regiment resulting in the shooting of several sailors and causing trouble for the Dutch as there was nobody in control.

The remainder of Regiment was later moved from Cape Town to Ceylon using the other French ship, the Hermione, to serve the Dutch. In the interim, the British agent Hugh Cleghorn in collaboration with Henry Dundas approached Charles-Daniel with a proposal and the regiment shifted its loyalty to the English. On 14 February 1796 the Dutch in Ceylon surrendered with minimal resistance. Charles-Daniel received a sum of £4000 for the transfer and Cleghorn was paid £5000 and made Crown Secretary to Ceylon. In 1798, the Regiment entered full service of the British Army with 2 battalions of five companies of infantry each. The Regiment took part in the battle of Seringapatnam on the side of Wellesley and helped in the successful seizure of Mysore from Tipu Sultan. Comte Charles-Daniel returned to Switzerland leaving command of the regiment to his brother Pierre Frédéric de Meuron. The Regiment remained in India until 1806, the same year in which Charles de Meuron died.

References

External links
 de Meuron Regiment
 Swiss museum notes
 Notes on Charles-Daniels in the Cape

1738 births
1806 deaths
Counts of France
Charles
Recipients of the Order of Military Merit (France)
Swiss nobility
Nobility of Neuchâtel
Swiss mercenaries